Temenothyra, or Temenothyrae or Temenothyrai, was a town of ancient Lydia, or of Phrygia, inhabited during Roman and Byzantine times. It became a bishopric; no longer the seat of a residential bishop, under the name Temenothyrae it remains a titular see of the Roman Catholic Church.

Its site is located near Uşak in Asiatic Turkey.

References

Populated places in ancient Lydia
Populated places in Phrygia
Catholic titular sees in Asia
Former populated places in Turkey
Roman towns and cities in Turkey
Populated places of the Byzantine Empire
History of Uşak Province